Euxoa decora is a moth of the family Noctuidae. It is found in southern and central Europe, Morocco, Algeria, the Caucasus, Armenia, Issyk-Kul, Turkey, Iran and Iraq.

Description
It has a typical wingspan of 38–41 mm. Warren states E. decora Schiff. ( nebulosa Hbn., marcens Chr.) (6d). Forewing dull ashgrey, sometimes with a brownish or ochreous tinge; lines dark, often obscure; stigmata pale, sometimes ochreous; claviform, when present , yellowish ; hindwing dull fuscous , with the base paler in male. Common on the Mountains of Central Europe and in Armenia; — in ab. livida Stgr. (6d) the ground colour is dark purplish grey and the stigmata well-defined; the orbicular round and sometimes filled up with ochreous.

Subspecies
Euxoa decora decora (eastern part of the Alps and adjacent regions in the east, northern Italy)
Euxoa decora simulatrix (western Alps, Pyrenees)
Euxoa decora splendida (Italy (Abruzzi))
Euxoa decora macedonica (southern Yugoslasvia, north-western and southern Greece)
Euxoa decora olympica (central Greece (Olympus and Grammos Mountains))
Euxoa decora hackeri (northern Greece (Mount Phalakron))

Biology
Each generation of adults are on wing from July to September, and larvae feed on a wide range of low growing plants, including Anthyllis vulneraria.

References

External links
Fauna Europaea
Moths and Butterflies of Europe and North Africa

Euxoa
Moths of Europe
Moths described in 1775